"First Call" is a bugle call with three distinct meanings.

U.S. military use
At a U.S. military installation it is a pre-reveille "courtesy" signal, sounded around 05:50, originally to assemble the trumpeters to deliver the reveille that would be forthcoming at 06:00. Some locations also sound it a few minutes before "Retreat" (lowering the flag at the end of the day).  In other military contexts it may be used (e.g. 5 minutes) prior to sounding "Assembly" for any particular formation.

Navy use
On ships of the U.S. Navy, "First Call" is sounded at 0755, five minutes ahead of "Morning Colors" (raising the national ensign), and 5 minutes before "Evening Colors" (lowering the national ensign). In the absence of a bugle, the word is passed, "First call, first call to colors." The same ceremony takes place on shore establishments but not on ships underway.

Horse racing
At a horse race, it is a signal that all mounts should be at the paddock exit in order to proceed to the track to begin the post parade. It started to be used at horse races prior to the 1860s. The tune is usually sounded by a bugler five to ten minutes before the scheduled start time of the race. The call serves a similar purpose in dog racing. In betting, it is the signal for the closing of any bets, with those being placed after the bugle is called considered a late bet; those who place a late bet may be disqualified or even thrown out of the race track or the casino. When "First call" is used for this purpose, it is usually referred to the "Call to the Post".

References

External multimedia
MP3 file, RealMedia file, FAS.org

Horse racing terminology
Sporting fanfares
Bugle calls